The S2 27 is an American sailboat that was designed by Graham & Schlageter as a cruiser and first built in 1985.

Production
The design was built by S2 Yachts in Holland, Michigan, United States from 1985 until 1987 with 85 boats completed, but it is now out of production.

Design
The S2 27 is a recreational keelboat, built predominantly of balsa-cored AME 4000 resin fiberglass, with wood trim. It has a masthead sloop rig, a raked stem, a plumb transom, a transom-hung rudder controlled by a tiller and a fixed fin keel. It displaces  and carries  of ballast.

The design has sleeping accommodation for four people, with a double "V"-berth in the bow cabin, an "L"-shaped settee and a straight settee in the main cabin. The galley is located on the port side just forward of the companionway ladder. The galley is "U"-shaped and is equipped with a two-burner stove, an ice box and a sink. The head is located at the companionway on the starboard side.

For sailing downwind the design may be equipped with a symmetrical spinnaker.

See also
List of sailing boat types

References

Keelboats
1980s sailboat type designs
Sailing yachts
Sailboat types built in the United States
Sailboat type designs by Graham & Schlageter
Sailboat types built by S2 Yachts